Sandra Verda (Genoa, June 30, 1959 - Voltaggio, September 10, 2014) was an Italian novelist and screenwriter. She was the recipient of the Rapallo Carige Prize for II male addosso  in 1985.

References

Italian women novelists
20th-century Italian women writers
20th-century Italian novelists
Italian women screenwriters
Italian screenwriters
Writers from Genoa
1959 births
2014 deaths